Allums is a surname.  Notable people with the surname include:

Darrell Allums (born 1958), American basketball player
Kye Allums (born 1989), American transgender advocate, public speaker, artist, mentor, and former basketball player

See also
Allum